Tuổi Trẻ ("Youth") is a major daily newspaper in Vietnam, publishing in Vietnamese from Hồ Chí Minh City. It was originally a publication of the Hồ Chí Minh Communist Youth Union (Vietnamese: Đoàn Thanh niên Cộng sản Hồ Chí Minh) of Ho Chi Minh City, and while it is still the official mouthpiece of that organization, it has grown to become the largest newspaper in the country. As of 2007 its daily circulation was 450,000.

The printed newspaper includes: Tuổi Trẻ daily, weekly Tuổi Trẻ Cuối Tuần, semimonthly Tuổi Trẻ Cười. Online versions includes: a Vietnamese version Tuổi Trẻ Online and an English version Tuoi Tre News.

History
Tuoi Tre Newspaper was officially established on September 2, 1975. However, its precursor was propaganda leaflets issued by students and pupils in Saigon during their anti-American movements in the Vietnam War.

In its early stage, Tuoi Tre circulated tri-weekly. On September 1, 2000, it started to issue one more on Friday. From April 2, 2006, it became a daily newspaper.

Offices

Its headquarters is located on 60A, Hoàng Văn Thụ Street, Ward 9, Phú Nhuận District, in the urban area of Ho Chi Minh City and not so far from Tan Son Nhat International Airport. Tuoi Tre has 8 representative offices in the capital city of Hanoi at 72A Thuy Khue Street (currently at 15 Doc Ngu Street - Ba Dinh District while the building at Thuy Khue Street is under reconstruction), Nghệ An, Huế, Đà Nẵng, Qui Nhơn, Nha Trang, Đà Lạt, and Cần Thơ.

Stance
Described as "pro-reformist" by the BBC, the newspaper has run into trouble with the communist authorities several times.

In May 1991, its editor in chief was sacked when the paper ran an article trepidly acknowledging Ho Chi Minh's early marriage to Zeng Xueming. Ms. Vu Kim Hanh, former Tuoi Tre Newspaper's editorial direction, was dismissed.

In 2000, it commissioned a survey among youths in Ho Chi Minh City which found that Bill Gates was more admired than Ho Chi Minh.  This resulted in the published copies being destroyed by state censors and three editors sanctioned.

In 2005, the newspaper published a series of investigative articles about the monopolization of the pharmaceutical market by Zuellig Pharma.  The reporter, Lan Anh, was subsequently dismissed.

In July 2018, the government suspended the newspaper from publishing online for 3 months and fined it 220 million VND.  The disciplinary action came after the newspaper published an article on June 19, 2018 quoting President Trần Đại Quang agreeing with the need for a new law regarding protests. It left in place a reader's comment, in another article previously published on May 26, 2017, that was deemed by the Press Authority to be "splitting national unity".  The Press Authority determined that the content of the article quoting the President was "untrue" and "caused severe impact".

See also
 List of newspapers in Vietnam
 Media of Vietnam

References

External links
English version Tuoi Tre News 
Vietnamese version Tuoi Tre Online
Tuoi Tre TV
 Tuoi Tre Cuoi Online: Tuoi Tre Cuoi

1975 establishments in Vietnam
Newspapers established in 1975
Newspapers published in Vietnam
Vietnamese-language newspapers
English-language newspapers published in Asia
Mass media in Ho Chi Minh City